Aaron Nicholas Cupples is an Australian born, London (UK) based, film composer, record producer, and musician. He has produced, composed or mixed for artists such as Spiritualized, Blanck Mass, Civil Civic, The Vaccines, The Drones, Miles Kane, Broken Social Scene, Paul Kelly, Dominique Young Unique, Dan Kelly, Snowman, and Standish/Carlyon.
He was described as "one of Australia’s most talented young producers” by Audio Technology magazine and produced and mixed two albums included in an industry-voted ’100 Greatest Australian Records Of All Time’ list.

He recently scored the original soundtrack for the film Island of the Hungry Ghosts for which he was nominated 'Best Music' at the British Independent film awards. The film premiered at the 2018 Tribeca Film Festival for where it won the Best Documentary award. The soundtrack has been described as "otherworldly and experimental" with a "supernatural aura" and was created with oversized, stretched and augmented wire instrumentation. "The effect is eerie and the tone befitting the film's themes and the island's essential wildness."

Recent work includes the score for The Disappearance of My Mother which premiered at 2019 Sundance Film Festival.

Awards

References

External links
 IMDB artist page

 official website

Year of birth missing (living people)
Australian record producers
Australian film score composers
Living people